Lotu may refer to:

People
 Brigitta Lotu-Iiga (born 1968), New Zealand rugby union player
 Lotu Filipine (born 1980), rugby union football player
 Lotu Fuli, politician
 Lotu Inisi (born 1999), Tongan rugby union player
 Sam Lotu-Iiga, politician

Places
 Loțu, Romania